Lai Ann, sometimes credited as "Ryan" or "Ryan Lai", is a comics author and illustrator of Taiwanese manhua. She was born July 16 in Taipei, Taiwan, and is published by Tong Li Comics. Her two-volume work Me and My Ainia won a 2008 Outstanding Comics Award from the Institute for Compilation and Translation of Taiwan.

Publications
Lai Ann has written numerous manhua series of varying length. They include:
 The Internship of Angel (天使的人間實習), 2008
 Me and My Ainia (我和我的艾尼亞), 2007–2008
 Steel Rose (鋼鐵玫瑰), 2005–2007
 Ingènuo (戀影天使), 1998–2004
 The Royal (薔薇豪情), 1995–1996
 It's Only Love (愛‧神話), 1994–2001
 Pure Love (純愛手記), 1994–2001
 Angel Hair (天堂絲絨), 1994–2001
 Falling Peony (落花), 1992–1995

She has also produced special art collections, such as Desire Carnival (賴安明信片書, 2000), Live Show (筆記書, 2002), and Anniversary (賴安彩繪自選集, 2003).

References

External links
 Lai Ann Official Website
 Lai Ann Official Blog

Taiwanese comics artists
Taiwanese comics writers
Taiwanese cartoonists
Living people
Artists from Taipei
National Taiwan University of Arts alumni
Year of birth missing (living people)